Kungsbackaån is a river in Sweden. It is located in Halland County.

References

Rivers of Halland County